Ang Syota Kong Balikbayan is a 1995 Philippine romantic action comedy film directed by Pablo Santiago. It stars Fernando Poe Jr. (who produced the film) and Anjanette Abayari.

Synopsis
Cathy returns from the US and discovers her uncle's plan to run off with all her wealth. Intending to stay with one of her relatives, she crosses paths with Nanding, a jeepney driver who happens to be her relative's neighbor.

Cast and characters
 Fernando Poe Jr. as Nanding
 Anjanette Abayari as Cathy
 Boy Alano as Tino / Tina

References

External links
 

1995 films
1995 action comedy films
1990s romantic action films
Filipino-language films
Philippine action comedy films
Viva Films films
Films directed by Pablo Santiago